Jacopo Belgrado, sometimes written Giacopo (November 16, 1704 in Udine – March 26, 1789 in Udine), was an Italian Jesuit, mathematician and natural philosopher.

Biography

Jacopo belonged to a noble family and received his education at Padua. He entered the novitiate of the Society of Jesus 16 October 1723, and showed marked talent, studying mathematics and philosophy at Bologna, under Father Luigi Marchenti, a former pupil of Pierre Varignon at Paris. After completing his philosophical studies he taught letters for several years at Venice.

He studied theology at Parma and then became professor of mathematics and physics at the university, holding this position for twelve years. While at Parma he did much experimental work in physics with apparatus specially constructed by two of his assistants. After pronouncing his solemn vows on 2 February 1742, Belgrado was summoned to the court, where he was appointed confessor, first to the Duchess, and later to the Duke Don Filippo, The title of mathematician of the court was also bestowed on him. He 1757 he erected an observatory on one of the towers of the college of Parma and furnished it with the necessary instruments. In 1773, he became rector of the college at Bologna. He was a member of most of the academies of Italy and a corresponding member of the French Academy of Sciences. He was likewise one of the founders of the Arcadian colony of Parma.

He wrote on a variety of subjects.

Works 
 
 
 I fenomeni elettrici (1749).
 
 
 De analyseos vulgaris usu in re physica (1761–62).
 
 
 Dell'esistenza di Dio da' teoremi geometrici (1777).

Further reading

See also
 List of Roman Catholic scientist-clerics

References

External links 
 
 

1704 births
1789 deaths
18th-century Italian scientists
Members of the French Academy of Sciences
18th-century Italian Jesuits
Jesuit scientists
People from Udine
Scientists from Padua